Washington-on-the-Brazos is an unincorporated community along the Brazos River in Washington County, Texas, United States. The town is best known for being the site of the Convention of 1836 and the signing of the Texas Declaration of Independence. 

The town is named for Washington, Georgia, itself named for George Washington. It is officially known as just "Washington," but after the Civil War came to be known as "Washington-on-the-Brazos" to distinguish the settlement from "Washington-on-the-Potomac," Washington, DC.

History
Washington was founded in 1833 by John W. Hall, one of the Old Three Hundred settlers, on land he had been given two years before by his father-in-law Andrew Robinson.  It was located at a ferry crossing over the Brazos River on the La Bahia Road that dated from 1821.

As the town grew, most settlers were immigrants from the Southern United States, in what was then Mexican Texas. Because of its location on the Brazos River and near major roads, Washington became a commercial center, drawing in new inhabitants from nearby areas. After the outbreak of the Texas Revolution, General Sam Houston made his headquarters at Washington in December 1835.

Washington-on-the-Brazos is known as "the birthplace of Texas" because, on March 1, 1836, Texas delegates met in the town to formally announce Texas' intention to separate from Mexico and to draft a constitution for the new Republic of Texas. They organized an interim government to serve until a permanent one could be formed.

The delegates adopted the Texas Declaration of Independence on March 2, 1836, signing it on the following day. They adopted their constitution on March 16. The delegates worked until March 17, when they had to flee with the residents of Washington, to escape the advancing Mexican Army. The townspeople returned after the Mexican Army was defeated at San Jacinto on April 21. Town leaders lobbied for Washington's designation as the permanent capital of the Republic of Texas, but leaders of the Republic favored Waterloo, later renamed Austin.

Washington County was established by the legislature of the Republic of Texas in 1836 and organized in 1837, when Washington-on-the-Brazos was designated as the county seat. Although the county seat moved to Brenham in 1844, the town continued to thrive as a center for the cotton trade until the mid-1850s, as it was located on the Brazos River to use for shipping out the crop. The construction of railroads bypassed the town and pulled off its businesses. The strife of the Civil War took another toll on the town, and by the turn of the 20th century, it was virtually abandoned.

Culture
The town is home to the Washington-on-the-Brazos Historical Site, which has three main attractions: The Star of the Republic Museum (a museum about the Texas Republic), a replica of Independence Hall (where the Texas Declaration of Independence was signed), and Barrington Living History Farm (home of last Texas Republic President Anson Jones).

The town is also home to Blessed Virgin Mary Catholic Church, founded in 1849 as the oldest Black Catholic church in Texas.

Washington Avenue in Houston is named for Washington-on-the-Brazos, and is the western route to Washington County.

Gallery

See also
List of museums in East Texas 
Open-air museum

References

External links

 
 
 
 
 

Unincorporated communities in Washington County, Texas
Unincorporated communities in Texas
Capitals of former nations
Texas
State parks of Texas
Protected areas of Washington County, Texas
Texas Revolution
Ghost towns in East Texas
Museums in Washington County, Texas
Living museums in Texas
History museums in Texas
Farm museums in Texas
Agriculture museums in the United States
Slave cabins and quarters in the United States